The Afghanistan men's national 3x3 team is a national basketball team of Afghanistan, administered by the Afghanistan National Basketball Federation (ANBF).
It represents the country in international 3x3 (3 against 3) basketball competitions.

See also
Afghanistan women's national 3x3 team
Afghanistan national basketball team

References

Basketball in Afghanistan
Basketball teams in Afghanistan
Men's national 3x3 basketball teams
Basketball